Sean Nunes (born 12 May 1973) is a Jamaican sailor. He competed in the men's 470 event at the 2000 Summer Olympics.

References

External links
 

1973 births
Living people
Jamaican male sailors (sport)
Olympic sailors of Jamaica
Sailors at the 2000 Summer Olympics – 470
Place of birth missing (living people)